Zapata Peninsula is a large peninsula in Matanzas Province, southern Cuba, at . Ciénaga de Zapata National Park is located on the peninsula.

It is located south of Ensenada de la Broa, east of the gulf of Batabano and north of the Gulf of Cazones. The Bay of Pigs defines its eastern limit. To the north, it is bounded by the Carretera Central highway.

Geography of Matanzas Province
Peninsulas of Cuba